XHMP-FM is a radio station on 95.5 FM in Torreón, Coahuila. The station is owned by GREM and carries the Exa FM format from MVS Radio.

History
XHMP received its concession on May 5, 1979. It was owned by Braulio Manuel Fernández Aguirre, a former senator, two-time federal deputy and mayor of Torreón. In April 2017, following Fernández Aguirre's 2016 death, the station concession transferred to his widow, María Cristina Murra Talamás, and then to a corporation.

References

External links
Exa FM Torreón Facebook

Radio stations in Coahuila
Radio stations in the Comarca Lagunera
1979 establishments in Mexico